Signet Press in Kolkata (previously Calcutta), West Bengal, India, is a publishing house established by Dilip Kumar Gupta (popularly known as D. K.) in 1943. Located at the famous book arcade of College Street in front of Sanskrit College. The famed film-director Satyajit Ray worked as a visual designer in this publishing house at the onset of his career and many of the books don the covers designed by him. The press has published many renowned books like Jawaharlal Nehru's Discovery of India, Bibhutibhushan Bandopadhyay's Pather Panchali and Chander Pahar, Jibanananda Das's Rupasi Bangla and Banalata Sen, Saat-ti taarar timir etc.By the end of the 70s though, D. K had fallen sick and soon followed by his death, The Signet Publishing house closed. It was revived back later after its purchase by the Ananda Publishers, thus giving the old historic publishing house a new pulse. Many of the classic signet publications are now once again available to the common readers, Be it the Samar Sen's Poem, Sukumar Roy's works or Sudhindranath Dutta's Sangbarta and Bishnu Dey's Naam rekhechi Komol Gandhar.

Significance in the history of Bengali publication 

The significance of Signet Press' arrival in College street, can be rightly found in the lines of Shankha Ghosh , from his book 'Boiyer Ghor". He writes:

"Then came the store of Signet press. That is, it came to College Street. Even in the forties, many books were published from Signet, with its infallible mark of elegance, its selection and printing. But with the opening of its new store on Bankim Chatterjee Street, we no longer had to wander from place to place looking for books of poetry, be it Jibanananda Das or Sudhindranath Dutta. Dilip Kumar Gupta's diligent work on the neatness of printing (everyone knows him as DK), Satyajit Ray's excellent taste of aesthetics illustrating its covers, and the writings of modern poets - all these combined to create a dream world for all of us.

The years of fifty-two and fifty-three, when we were at our twenty-one years of age, we saw the publication of new books from Signet, coming before our eyes one after the other; 'Banalata Sen', 'Sanvarta', 'Parapar', 'Naam rekhechi Komal Gandhar', 'Amavasya'!. 
Then came the new edition of 'orchestra' 
with a brand new, changed, introduction of which we began to return to our mouths: ‘I am rooted in darkness, rising towards the light’.  ‘Samar Sen’s Poems’,  The new versions of 'Swagata' and 'Kulaya O Kalpurush'to be released from Signet in their new attire were still a few years away.
 
It is safe to say that Signet also brought a lot of courage to modern poetry. They also started publishing books by young poets like Naresh Guha and Nirendranath Chakravarti. Besides, new versions of 'Prothoma' and 'Samrat', or 'Winter Prayer: Answer to Spring' appeared in different houses. We no longer have any thoughts for poetry books. Signet's organization was ubiquitous, with a liberal call for "read poetry, read poetry." 

They even had a lot of new ideas to pull the aspiring mind from many directions, like giving a little lovely slip with a book to write a gift.. .. "

References

Book publishing companies of India
Companies based in Kolkata
Indian companies established in 1943
Publishing companies established in 1943